Rehar is a small town in Bijnor district, in Uttar Pradesh state, India.

Geography
Rehar is located at
Latitude 29.3667 Longitude 78.7667 Altitude (feet) 738 Lat (DMS) 29° 22' 0N Long (DMS) 78° 46' 0E Altitude : It has an average elevation of 212 metres (696 feet).  Time zone (east)  IST (UTC+5:30) in India, state of Uttar Pradesh in Bijnor District

Other cities and towns in Bijnor District
Afzalgarh (4.8 nm)
Sherkot (9.6 nm)
Seohara (13.2 nm)
Dhampur (13.4 nm)
Barhapura (15.8 nm)
Puraini (16.7 nm)
Nagina (17.3 nm)
Tajpur (19.1 nm)
Kalagarh (8.0 nm)
Kanda (18.7 nm)
Jhirna (8.6 nm)
Kashipur (13.2 nm)
Jaspur (5.6 nm)
Surjannagar (7.5 nm)
Thakurdwara (10.9 nm)
Sahaspur (16.1 nm)
Jatpura (18.3 nm)
Dilari (19.0 nm)
Kanth (19.3 nm)

Demographics
As of 2001 India census, Rehar had a population of 4,954. Males constitute 53% of the population and females 47%. Rehar has an average literacy rate of 39%, lower than the national average of 59.5%; with 59% of the males and 41% of females literate. 17% of the population is under 6 years of age.

Tourism

Rehar Dam is very beautiful place. and there is a very big forest near dam, every type of animals you can see there, very beautiful place for tour. The dam was made and is maintained by the Uttar Pradesh Irrigation Department under the supervision of Engineer Abdul Ghani Khan.
Several major tourist attractions can be mentioned in the town’s surroundings, like Jim Corbett National Park (India) about 24 km, Nainital (India) about 69 km, Lake RUP Kundu (India), about 136 km, Red Fort (India) about 168 km, New Delhi (India) about 171 km, India Gate (India), about 171 km, Humayun's Tomb in Delhi (India) about 171 km, Glass river (India) about 174 km, Lotus Temple (India), about 172 km, Qutub Minar (India) about 180 km, Qutb Minar and its Monuments, Delhi (India) about 180 km, Mata mandir (India), about 203 km, 60 Ghanti wali mata (India) about 203 km, Khatu Shyam ji Mandir (India) about 203 km. The nearest international airport (DEL) Delhi Indira Gandhi Intl Airport is situated about 185 km from Rehar.

Worship places

Mosque 
There are seven mosques (Maszid) in Rehar town. All are very old and located on every main street. Out of seven mosques there are three which run Three Madarsas in the town for the free study of Quran and Hadith. One mosque is called Jama Maszid which is larger than the other mosques of town.

Temple 
There is a lone temple (Shivalaya) dated back to 1900. The temple used to be inside the residential premises of the late Pandit Charan Dass, father of Pandit Musaddi Lal Kaushik, who later settled in Dhampur. In the remaining portion of residence of Pt Charan Dass and permitted  by Pandit Musaddi  Lal Kaushik, now a  primary school is being run by the locals through Government aid.

Mona Sati Math 
A Small Math belongs to Sati Mona the Ancestor Sati said to be approximately  400 years old is situated in the field owned by a local Brahmin Farmer on the out skirt of Rehar on National High way Number 74.

Education institutions

Inter college 
Govt Navratan Inter College (G.N.I.C): which has been built on land donated by Kunwar Nav Ratan Singh Rathod and Pandit Musaddi Lal Kaushik s/o Pandit Charan Dass Kaushik, is imparting education not only to the local residents but catering to the educational needs of common men of a number of villages in the vicinity.

Degree college 
A P.G.Degree college is situated about 2 Kilometers away at Baadigarh Riyaasat of Kunwar Shri Tripurari Singh Rathore Estate Rehar also a P.G. college is approximately eight kilometers away at [Afzalgarh].

References

Cities and towns in Bijnor district